The February 1899 North Antrim by-election was held on 25 February 1899.  The by-election was held following the resignation of the previous member Hugh McCalmont who was a member of the Irish Unionist Party. It was won unopposed by the Irish Unionist Party candidate William Moore.

External links 
A Vision Of Britain Through Time

References

1899 elections in the United Kingdom
By-elections to the Parliament of the United Kingdom in County Antrim constituencies
19th century in County Antrim